Bárbara Seixas de Freitas (born 8 March 1987 in Rio de Janeiro) is a Brazilian beach volleyball player, playing as a defender. In 2012, she was named FIVB top Rookie of the year. Seixas is a three-time youth World Champion and has reached the podium in several FIVB Beach Volleyball World Tour tournaments. She won a bronze medal at the 2013 World Championships alongside her teammate Liliane Maestrini, and per 13 August 2013 they rank third among the women's money leaders with $108,875.

In 2015, Seixas and her partner Ágatha Bednarczuk won a gold medal at the 2015 Beach Volleyball World Championships.

Professional career

Rio de Janeiro 2016
Bárbara and her partner Ágatha beat Kerri Walsh-Jennings and April Ross of United States, in straight sets of (22-20), (21-18) in the semi-final match in the Rio 2016 Summer Olympics. They lost in the deciding match for gold against Laura Ludwig and Kira Walkenhorst of Germany.

References

External links
 
 
 Personal blog
 
 

Brazilian women's beach volleyball players
Volleyball players from Rio de Janeiro (city)
1987 births
Living people
Beach volleyball defenders
Olympic beach volleyball players of Brazil
Beach volleyball players at the 2016 Summer Olympics
Olympic silver medalists for Brazil
Medalists at the 2016 Summer Olympics
Olympic medalists in beach volleyball
FIVB World Tour award winners
21st-century Brazilian women
South American Games gold medalists for Brazil
Competitors at the 2022 South American Games